Northern route may refer to

 North–South Expressway northern route
 Northern Dispersal
 Northern Sea Route